Naval Forces Eastern Mindanao, (abbrv. as NAVFOREASTMIN), is one of the Philippine Navy's Force Commands combating terrorism and insurgency in Mindanao.

Mission
Their mission is to conduct sustained Internal Security Operations (ISO) in Eastern Mindanao in the form of maritime support in order to neutralize the Communist-Terrorist Movement (CTM) and reduce their operational capabilities. One of their missions is to support local law enforcement as well as the Philippine National Police in containing the Moro Islamic Liberation Front while supporting the peace process; and destroy the Abu Sayyaf Group and the Jemaah Islamiya network operating in their area of operations. This is needed to establish a secured back door and maintain a physically and psychologically sound environment conducive to growth and development.

Operations
 Anti-guerrilla operations against the New People's Army 
 Anti-terrorist operations against the Abu Sayyaf operating in their area of responsibility.

See also
Rodrigo Duterte speech during a wake visit to killed-in-action NavForEastMin soldiers, August 2016

References

Official Site of the Naval Forces Eastmin

Commands of the Philippine Navy
Military units and formations established in 1991
Davao City